This is a list of episodes for Perry Mason, an American legal drama series that aired on CBS television for nine seasons (September 21, 1957 – May 22, 1966). The title character, portrayed by Raymond Burr, is a fictional Los Angeles criminal defense lawyer who originally appeared in detective fiction by Erle Stanley Gardner. Many episodes are based on novels and short stories written by Gardner, with some stories having been adapted more than once.

Series overview

Episodes

Season 1 (1957–58)

Season 2 (1958–59)

Season 3 (1959–60)

Season 4 (1960–61)

Season 5 (1961–62)

Season 6 (1962–63)

Season 7 (1963–64)

Season 8 (1964–65)

Season 9 (1965–66)

Notable episodes

"The Case of the Moth-Eaten Mink" (episode 1–13) was the pilot film for the Perry Mason series. It was filmed October 3–9, 1956, more than a year before it aired. Written and directed like a film noir second feature, it was a hit with CBS executives and earned the series a good time slot for the 1957–58 season.

In four episodes adapted from Erle Stanley Gardner novels — "The Case of the Silent Partner" (episode 1–6), "The Case of the Baited Hook" (episode 1–14), "The Case of the Velvet Claws" (episode 6-22) and "The Case of the Careless Kitten" (episode 8-24) — the cases are solved without ever going into the courtroom. "Although Gardner's Mason had often maneuvered so successfully on his clients' behalf that they never had to appear in court", wrote film scholar Thomas Leitch, "television episodes without such scenes are highly unusual."

"The Case of the Terrified Typist" (episode 1-38), "The Case of the Witless Witness" (episode 6-28) and the much-hyped "The Case of the Deadly Verdict" (episode 7–4) are episodes in which Perry Mason loses cases in some form or manner. He has implicitly lost a capital case in "The Case of the Desperate Daughter" (episode 1-27); Mason and Della Street are first seen preparing a last-minute appeal for a "Mr. Hudson" who has an impending date with the gas chamber.

At least a couple of actors who appeared in episodes went onto have highly successful film careers. Robert Redford is amongst the supporting cast in “The Case of the Treacherous Toupee”, while Burt Reynolds features in “The Case of the Counterfeit Crank”.

William Talman (Hamilton Burger) was fired by CBS March 18, 1960, hours after he entered a not-guilty plea to misdemeanor charges related to his presence at a party that was raided by police. The schedule was immediately juggled to minimize Talman's presence on the show. "The Case of the Crying Cherub" (episode 3-20) debuts a pared-down title sequence that omits Talman; he is credited only in the last four episodes he filmed before he was fired. Talman was defended by Gail Patrick Jackson, Burr and others, but even dismissal of the charges in June did not soften the network's position. Patrick said that the role of Burger would not be recast, but that various actors would play assistant district attorneys. CBS reinstated Talman only after Gardner himself weighed in, together with millions of viewers. Talman went back to work December 9, 1960, and Burger first returned in "The Case of the Fickle Fortune" (episode 4–15). Burger was not in the following two episodes and returns again in "The Case of the Angry Dead Man" (episode 4–18).

"The Case of the Counterfeit Crank" (episode 5-27) is a rare episode in which Perry Mason calls his own defendant to the witness stand.

"The Case of the Weary Watchdog" (episode 6–9) is a rare episode that has a jury trial, a case goes to deliberations, Della Street testifies, Perry's own client testifies, Della Street will be charged as an accomplice and Perry sticks himself into another court proceeding to free his client.

In October 1962, Gail Patrick Jackson announced that four episodes from season six would feature special guest stars who would cover for Raymond Burr during his convalescence from surgery. Perry Mason fan Bette Davis began filming "The Case of Constant Doyle" (episode 6–16) December 12, 1962. The other three special episodes are "The Case of the Libelous Locket" (episode 6–17) starring Michael Rennie; "The Case of the Two-Faced Turnabout" (episode 6–18) starring Hugh O'Brian; and "The Case of the Surplus Suitor" (episode 6–19) starring Walter Pidgeon. To provide continuity, brief scenes were shot in Burr's hospital room that showed Mason speaking on the phone to each of the attorney friends who was managing his caseload while he was in Europe.

"The Case of the Capering Camera" (episode 7–15), filmed in October 1963, marks the last appearance by Ray Collins as the irascible and often-incorrect Lt. Tragg. Although it was clear Collins would not return to work on the series, his name appeared in the opening title sequence through the eighth season, which ended in May 1965. Executive producer Gail Patrick Jackson was aware that Collins watched the show every week and did not wish to discourage him. Collins died of emphysema July 11, 1965.

When Burr was hospitalized for jaw surgery in 1964, special guest stars substituted for him in two episodes. The first, "The Case of the Bullied Bowler" (episode 8–7), was regarded as one of the best episodes of the season. Taking place while Mason is in Europe, the episode stars Mike Connors as an attorney friend of Paul Drake. Broadcast two months later, the second episode was "The Case of the Thermal Thief" (episode 8–16), starring Barry Sullivan. These are the only two Perry Mason episodes in which Burr makes no appearance.

"The Case of the Fatal Fetish" (episode 8-21) is the first of four episodes in which Burr shows the effects of an injury suffered in January 1965 following his third visit to U.S. military personnel in South Vietnam. He required surgery after tearing his shoulder tendons, and wears a large plaster cast under his clothing in that episode and in "The Case of the Sad Sicilian" (episode 8-22). His right arm is in a sling in "The Case of the Murderous Mermaid" (episode 8-23) and "The Case of the Careless Kitten" (episode 8-24).

"The Case of the Mischievous Doll" (episode 8-30) features the last appearance of Wesley Lau as Lt. Anderson.

"The Case of the Twice-Told Twist" (episode 9-21) is the only episode of the series that was filmed in color.

"The Case of the Dead Ringer" (episode 9-26) features Burr in a unique dual role, playing Mason and his doppelgänger, a grizzled seadog hired to impersonate and discredit him.

"The Case of the Final Fade-Out" (episode 9-30), the last episode of the series, was filmed April 12–19, 1966. Perry Mason creator Erle Stanley Gardner makes his sole appearance as an actor, playing the judge presiding at the second trial. It was Gail Patrick Jackson's idea to give Gardner and other behind-the-scenes members of the production crew a chance to appear in uncredited cameos:

 Witness 1 is prop man Ray Thompson.
 Witness 2 is accountant Bernie Oseransky.
 Witness 3 is Johnny Nickolaus, director of photography.
 Witness 4 is electrician Bob Kaplan.
 Assistant prop man John Ferry portrays director Phil Shields.
 Assistant director Gordon Webb is the assistant director.
 Second grip Wendell Jones is photographer Tad Wyman.
 Script supervisor Marshall Schlom is Cliff, the script supervisor.
 Sound engineer Herman Lewis plays the sound mixer.
 The second assistant director is Dave Marks, second assistant director and father of producer Arthur Marks.
 Mill foreman Buck Jones appears as himself.
 Construction coordinator Mickey Woods appears as himself.
 Ann Bernaducci, secretary to producer Arthur Marks, plays the producer's secretary.
Costumer Evelyn Carruth (with her dog, Buff) is the costumer.
 Assistant cameraman Dennis Dalzell is the assistant cameraman.
 Camera operator Jack Woolf is the camera operator.
 Key grip Harry Jones appears as himself.
 Dimmer boy and practical Jim Lowery plays himself.
 Gaffer Larry Peets plays himself.
 Best boy Cece Lupton plays himself.
 Film editor Dick Farrell is the cutter.
 Hairdresser Annabell Levy appears as herself.
 Makeup man Irving Pringle plays himself.
 Director Jesse Hibbs is the man waxing the car.
 Barbara Hale plays a second role, a blonde starlet in sunglasses.
 The man at her table who kisses her is producer Arthur Marks.
 Art director Lewis Creber is the man who interrupts them.
 Actor Mark Roberts is one of the men in the background.
 Set decorator Carl Biddiscombe is one of the men in the background.
 Bill Swan, executive assistant to Raymond Burr, is the piano player.
 Executive producer Gail Patrick Jackson is seated at the bar, speaking to producer Art Seid.
 Thomas Cornwell Jackson, Patrick's husband at the time, Erle Stanley Gardner's literary agent, and a partner in Paisano Productions, is the bartender.
 Lester Salkow, Burr's agent, is the man talking to the bartender.
 Anne Nelson, vice president of business affairs for CBS Entertainment, is the barmaid.

The second murder victim is Jackson Sidemark, a producer whose name is an in-joke — a composite of the surnames of Paisano partners Gail Patrick Jackson and Thomas Cornwell Jackson ("Jackson") and producers Art Seid and Arthur Marks ("Sidemark").

The sequence in the bar was the last Perry Mason scene to be filmed. In her sole appearance in the series, Gail Patrick Jackson broke the rule against ad libs. The script called for her to say, "I wouldn't take that show if they begged me. Who wants that time slot?" Instead she said, "I wouldn't take that show. Who wants to be opposite Bonanza?" It is a final commentary on the tables being turned by the NBC series that Perry Mason had bested in the Nielsen ratings for its first two seasons.

Notes

References

External links
 Perry Mason at CBS.com
 

.E
Lists of American crime drama television series episodes